Jane Njoki Mugambi (née Kimemia), OGW, PHD ( 23 December 1967) was born in Gituamba Sub-Location, Githerioni Location, Lari Constituency, Kiambu County, Central Region,  Kenya, and is the Policy Advisor to the Cabinet Secretary for the Ministry of Interior and Coordination of National Government of Kenya, Secretary for the Project Implementation for the National Development Implementation Communication Cabinet Committee, Principal Administrative Secretary and Secretary Coordination in the Ministry of Interior and coordination of the National Coordination of the Government of Kenya. She was previously Chief Executive Officer Secretary of State's Corporations Advisory Committee Between 15 March 2013 – 14 October 2019 for a cumulative period of six years seven months; served as the Secretary to the Presidential Task Force on Parastatal Reforms (Head of Secretariat) between 23 July 2013 and 9 October 2013, for a cumulative period of three months; served as the Secretary to the Presidential Committee on Implementation of Parastatal Reforms (Head of Secretariat); served as the Chairperson On The Taskforce on Developing a Handbook for State Owned Entities on Corporate Ethics and Business Integrity (Spearhead Reform Continentally) and led Kenya to gain admission to the Organization for Economic Development and Cooperation (OECD) as a member of the State Owned Entities Network for Southern Africa and continuously serves in the Kenyan Public Service. Mugambi was an Associate Principal of The Academic Satellite Centre in Nairobi City, Nairobi Region, with additional responsibility for other centres at Nakuru City, Rift Valley Region, Nyeri Town, Central Region and Mombasa City, Coast Region as the Human Resource Administrator Manager, reporting to the Deputy Vice Chancellor – Academic Affairs, from time to time reports to the Vice Chancellor Professor Mutuma Mugambi., DSM., MBS., MBChB., Dip., CardioL., PhD., MKAS., FCAM., SS from 29 December 2005 to 20 February 2007, also served as the Deputy Registrar, human resource and administration from 17 September 2002 to 29 December 2005, served as Secretary from 13 September 1999 to 13 September 2002 and as an entry level position of an Administrative Secretary from 13 September 1996 to 13 September 1999; she cumulatively served for a period of fourteen years in the private service sector.

Mugambi, OGW, PHD holds a Bachelor of Arts degree in political science from the University of Nairobi, Second Class Honors; Lower Division, an Master's Degree in Business Administration  human resource management option from Kenyatta University and a doctorate in business administration and management from Dedan Kimathi University of Technology, Kenya. She is a member of the Institute of Human Resources Management of Kenya and The Chartered Institute of Marketing in the United Kingdom. She was the principal advisor to the president of Kenya, sector cabinet secretaries, principal secretaries and boards, and chief executive officers of state-owned entities on matters relating to the governance and management matters of state corporations.

Missus Mugambi is a widow and was married to the Late Professor Mutuma Mugambi ; DSM;MBS;MBChB;Dip.Cardiol;PhD;MKAS;FCAM;SS. She is the mother of Ivan Mwaniki Mutitika, Sonia Nkatha Mugambi, Mwiti Mutuma Mugambi and Kimemia Mutuma Mugambi.

References

External links
https://web.archive.org/web/20160125100117/http://www.scac.go.ke/index.php/2015-02-16-09-29-13/the-committee/144-jane-mugambi-ogw

1967 births
Kenyan civil servants
Living people
University of Nairobi alumni
Kenyatta University alumni
Dedan Kimathi University alumni
People from Kiambu County